Angelina Anatolyevna Shkatova (born 25 January 2001) is Russian group rhythmic gymnast. She is the 2021 European Group All-around champion and the 2015 European Junior Group All-around champion.

Career

Junior
She competed as a member of the Russian Group that competed at the 2015 European Junior Championships where Russia won Group All-around gold medal and silver in 5 Balls final.

Senior
She was part of Russian group from St. Petersburg that took three gold medals (Group All-around, 5 Balls, 3 Hoops + 4 Clubs) at the 2019 Summer Universiade in Naples, Italy.

In 2020, she was invited to join the main Russian national group. Her first major competition with the new squad was Grand Prix Moscow in February.  They won gold medal in Group All-around (64.250) in front of Belarus (61.250) and Israel (57.400). They also won gold medals in both Apparatus finals the next day.

In 2021, she started the season at Grand Prix Moscow, where they took gold medal in Group All-around (80.900) in front of Belarus (74.650) and Uzbekistan (73.500). In the end of May, she competed at the 2021 Pesaro World Cup, where she won gold medal in Group All-around and two silver medals in Apparatus finals. On July 5, 2021, the Russian Federation announced that Shkatova was selected to represent Russia at the 2020 Olympic Games in Tokyo, Japan, as a member of the Russian group formed by Anastasia Tatareva, Anastasia Bliznyuk, Anastasia Maksimova and Alisa Tishchenko. In 2021 Moscow World Challenge Cup, the Russian group took gold in all aspects ahead of Japan and all possible golds in the apparatus finals ahead of Uzbekistan. 

From August 7-8, the Russian group competed in the 2020 Olympic Games where they achieved the silver medal in the general competition behind Bulgaria, and it is the first time in 25 years that Russia has lost the first place and the gold medal in the Olympic Games.

Detailed Olympic results

References

External links
 
 

2001 births
Living people
Russian rhythmic gymnasts
Medalists at the Rhythmic Gymnastics European Championships
Medalists at the 2019 Summer Universiade
Universiade medalists in gymnastics
Universiade gold medalists for Russia
Gymnasts at the 2020 Summer Olympics
Olympic gymnasts of Russia
Medalists at the 2020 Summer Olympics
Olympic medalists in gymnastics
Olympic silver medalists for the Russian Olympic Committee athletes